Paul Konsler (15 January 1913 – 21 September 2007) was a French sports shooter. He competed in two events at the 1952 Summer Olympics in Helsinki.

References

External links
 

1913 births
2007 deaths
French male sport shooters
Olympic shooters of France
Shooters at the 1952 Summer Olympics
Sportspeople from Nancy, France